Northlanders is an American comic book series published by DC Comics under their Vertigo imprint. The stories are fictional but set in and around historical events during the Viking Age.

Northlanders is written by Brian Wood, illustrated by various artists on a per storyline basis, and with painted cover art by Massimo Carnevale. The first issue of the series was published on December 5, 2007.

The series was canceled by Vertigo on April 11, 2012, at issue #50.

Plot
Northlanders alternates long and short story arcs, each of which deals with a different protagonist in a different time period within the Viking Age.

The first story arc, "Sven the Returned", runs through issues #1–8 and is set in A.D. 980. It follows a self-exiled Viking warrior named Sven who has been serving in the Byzantine Varangian Guard, and is now returning to his birth region in the Orkney Islands in order to reclaim his rightful inheritance.

The second arc, "Lindisfarne", runs through issues #9 and 10, and is about a young boy and the sacking of the Lindisfarne monastery in A.D. 793, the beginning of the Viking Age.

The third arc, "The Cross + The Hammer", runs through issues #11–16 and is set around Dublin, Ireland circa the Battle of Clontarf, which took place in A.D. 1014; it deals with the pursuit of an Irishman and his daughter who attacks the occupying Viking forces using guerrilla tactics.

Collected editions
The series is being collected into trade paperbacks:

Later also collected in the following omnibus editions:

Awards
 2007: Nominated for the Eagle Award for "Favourite Comics Cover published during 2007" for cover of issue 1B by Adam Kubert

References

External links 
 Northlanders #1 at DC/Vertigo comics
 Northlanders on Brian Wood's website
 Viking Clash Pits Old Against New in Northlanders, Publishers Weekly, November 13, 2007

Interviews
 Y1K PARANOIA: Brian Wood talks "Northlanders", Comic Book Resources, October 16, 2007 
 Interview/Preview: Vertigo's Northlanders, IGN, October 22, 2007
 Ragnarok n’ Roll: An interview with Brian Wood, Comics Bulletin, November 20, 2007
 Brian Wood Talks Northlanders 2009, Comic Book Resources, January 27, 2009
 The Viking Chronicles: Brian Wood Talks Northlanders, Newsarama, June 24, 2009

Comics set in the Viking Age
2008 comics debuts
2012 comics endings
Fictional Vikings